A Woman at Her Window is a 1976 French drama film directed by Pierre Granier-Deferre, starring Romy Schneider, Philippe Noiret, Victor Lanoux and Umberto Orsini. Based on the 1929 novel Hotel Acropolis by Pierre Drieu La Rochelle, it tells the story of a woman who helps a union leader sought by police in 1930s Greece.

The film had 1,205,887 admissions in France. At the 2nd César Awards, Schneider was nominated for Best Actress and Jean Ravel was nominated for Best Editing.

Plot
In Greece in 1936, Rico and Margot are married in name only. He pursues other women while she, rich and beautiful, has many suitors, the most bearable being Raoul. Outwardly frivolous, what she wants is not an extramarital affair but a grand passion. One hot night in August she sees from her window a man pursued by the police and on an impulse lets him hide in her bedroom. He is Michel, an anti-regime militant whose courage, idealism, and humanity overwhelm her. To hide him from the police, she gets him hired as chauffeur to Raoul and the two then disappear together. Rico and Raoul try to find her, but in vain. In 1967 a young woman visits Greece, trying to find traces of her parents: Margot and Michel.

Cast
 Romy Schneider as Margot (Santorini)
 Philippe Noiret as Raoul Malfosse
 Victor Lanoux as Michel Boutros
 Umberto Orsini as Rico (Santori)
 Gastone Moschin as Primoukis
 Delia Boccardo as Dora Cooper
 Martine Brochard as Avghi
 Neli Riga as Amalia
 Joachim Hansen as Stahlbaum
 Carl Möhner as Von Pahlen
 Vasilis Kolovos as Andréas
 Paul Muller as Le Directeur
 Camille Piton as Le Gardien
 Aldo Farina as L'Américain

References

External links

1976 films
1976 drama films
Films based on French novels
Films based on works by Pierre Drieu La Rochelle
Films directed by Pierre Granier-Deferre
Films scored by Carlo Rustichelli
Films set in Greece
Films shot in Athens
Films set in the 1930s
Films set in the 1940s
French drama films
1970s French-language films
French nonlinear narrative films
1970s French films